The 1987 Iowa Hawkeyes football team represented the University of Iowa in the 1987 NCAA Division I-A football season. The Hawkeyes played their home games at Kinnick Stadium and were led by head coach Hayden Fry. Iowa finished the season with a 10–3 record (6–2 Big Ten), capped by a Holiday Bowl victory over Wyoming.

Schedule

Roster

Rankings

Game summaries

vs. Tennessee

Source: Box score

at Arizona

Source: Box Score and Game Story

at Iowa State

Source: Box Score and Game Story

Kansas State

Source: Box Score and Game Story

Michigan State

Source: Box Score and Game Story

at Wisconsin

Source: Box Score and Game Story

at Michigan

Source: Box Score and Game Story

Purdue

Source: Box Score and Game Story

Indiana

Source: Box Score and Game Story

at Northwestern

Sources: Box Score and Game Story
    
    
    
    
    
    
    
    
    
    
    
    

Chuck Hartlieb completed 25 of 32 passes for 471 yards and a Big Ten single-game record 7 touchdowns.
 Wide receiver Quinn Early hauled in 10 passes and set school records with 256 yards receiving (Big Ten record at the time) and 4 touchdown receptions. The 584 team passing yards remains a single-game school record.

at Ohio State

Source: Box Score and Game Story

With six seconds left, Chuck Hartlieb threw a 28-yard touchdown pass to Marv Cook on fourth-and-23 to earn Iowa's first victory at Ohio Stadium since 1959.

Minnesota

Source: Box Score and Game Story

vs. Wyoming (Holiday Bowl)

Awards and honors
Dave Haight, Defensive tackle – Big Ten Defensive Lineman of the Year

Team players in the 1988 NFL draft

References

Iowa
Iowa Hawkeyes football seasons
Holiday Bowl champion seasons
Iowa Hawkeyes football